Altevir Silva Filho de Araújo (born December 23, 1955) is a retired sprinter from Brazil, he was a Brazilian champion, but he was  best known for winning two gold medals (100 and 200 metres) at the 1979 South American Championships in Bucaramanga, Colombia.

He represented his native country at the 1980 Summer Olympics, where he was eliminated in the second round of the men's 200 metres. In the same tournament he finished in 8th place with the men's relay team in the 4x100 metres, alongside Milton de Castro, Nelson Rocha dos Santos, and Katsuhiko Nakaya.

International competitions

References

 1979 Year Rankings

1955 births
Living people
Brazilian male sprinters
Olympic athletes of Brazil
Athletes (track and field) at the 1980 Summer Olympics
Pan American Games medalists in athletics (track and field)
Pan American Games bronze medalists for Brazil
Athletes (track and field) at the 1979 Pan American Games
Medalists at the 1979 Pan American Games